Robby Carter (born October 20, 1960) is an American politician who has served in the Louisiana House of Representatives from the 72nd district since 2016. He previously served in the Louisiana House of Representatives from 1996 to 2008.

References

1960 births
Living people
Democratic Party members of the Louisiana House of Representatives
20th-century American politicians
21st-century American politicians